Alexander Hack (born 8 September 1993) is a German professional footballer who plays as a centre-back for Bundesliga club Mainz 05. At international level, he made four appearances for the Germany U20 national team.

Career
Hack joined 1. FSV Mainz 05's reserve team from SpVgg Unterhaching in 2014 and became a regular starter.

He made his first-team debut in the Bundesliga in the first half of the 2015–16 season in a 3–1 win against Eintracht Frankfurt.

In June 2017, Hack agreed a contract extension until 2022 with Mainz.

References

External links
 Profile at the 1. FSV Mainz 05 website 
 
 
 

1993 births
Living people
People from Memmingen
Sportspeople from Swabia (Bavaria)
German footballers
Footballers from Bavaria
Association football defenders
Germany youth international footballers
Bundesliga players
3. Liga players
Regionalliga players
FC Memmingen players
SpVgg Unterhaching players
1. FSV Mainz 05 players
1. FSV Mainz 05 II players